The 1905–06 British Home Championship was the 22nd edition of the annual international football tournament played between the British Home Nations. The trophy was shared between the two sides which regularly dominated the competition, England and Scotland who each gained four points.

England and Ireland began the tournament in February 1906, with England scoring five goals without reply and rising to the head of the table. Wales joined them after their match with Scotland which they won in Edinburgh by 2–0. Scotland recovered to beat Ireland by a single goal and England then moved ahead by beating Wales with an identical scoreline in Cardiff. Playing for lower rankings, Wales and Ireland fought out a thrilling 4–4 draw in Wrexham before the deciding game between England and Scotland at Hampden Park; England needed only a draw to take the title outright, but Scotland played well and in a flowing match triumphed 2–1 to share the honours.

Parts of the Wales vs Ireland match at Wrexham were filmed by the Blackburn company of Mitchell and Kenyon, and is now the oldest surviving footage of an international football match.

Table

Results

Winning squads

References

Notes

1906 in British sport
Brit
1905–06 in English football
1905–06 in Scottish football
1905
Brit